Oraesia nobilis is a species of moth of the family Erebidae first described by Cajetan von Felder and Alois Friedrich Rogenhofer in 1874. It is found in Costa Rica, Nicaragua, French Guiana, Peru and Brazil.

References

Calpinae
Moths of South America
Moths of Central America
Insects of Brazil
Moths described in 1874